Manadhai Thirudivittai is a 2001 Indian Tamil-language musical comedy film written and directed by newcomer R. D. Narayanamurthy. The film stars Prabhu Deva, Kausalya, and newcomer Gayatri Jayaraman, while Vadivelu, Vivek, Ranjith, and Sriman play supporting roles. The film, which has music scored by Yuvan Shankar Raja, released on 14 November 2001 and became a commercial success.

Plot
Deva is a post-graduate student in Ooty musical college. He is an orphan who was raised in an orphanage and is studying on by his friend's sponsorship. College heartthrob Shruthi studies in an undergraduate course in the same college. Deva falls head over heels for Shruthi and tries to win her with the help of his friend and classmate, Steve. One day, Shruthi cheats and embarrasses Deva in the name of love, which hurts him very deeply. Later, she understands his love and proposes to him. After some time, he meets his childhood friend Ashok on the road and goes to his house. There, he meets Indhu, Ashok's fierce sister. He gets impressed with Indhu's voice and asks her to sing in his band. He tries to befriend Indhu, but she complains to the police that he is eve-teasing her. The police takes Deva to the police station and thrashes him. This makes Shruthi very angry, and she goes to Ashok's house and shouts at Indhu for her mannerless behavior towards men and also her boyfriend. Ashok and Deva stop the argument between both the ladies. When Ashok realizes that Shruthi is still angry, he opens up a story which reveals why Indhu behaves in such a way. Indhu is revealed to have been drugged and raped during her college tour. Thereafter, no one questions her about the bad incident anymore.

To cheer Indhu up, Deva covertly brings Indhu's favorite singer, P. Susheela, to her home. Indhu is extremely happy to spend time with Susheela. After knowing that Deva was the one who did this, she apologizes for her rude behavior. By this time, Deva and Shruthi are going to be engaged. Deva invites his best friend Ranjith to the engagement and introduces his future wife to him. Deva points to Shruthi, but when Ranjith sees her, it turns out to be Indhu walking towards them. A shocked Ranjith congratulates Deva, saying he has a big heart that he was willing to marry the girl he raped. Then Ranjith narrates the story, when his friends went to Kuttraalam. There, Ranjith's friends force Deva to drink beer and make him drunk enough to meet a call girl at room 21 in the same hotel. Indhu happened to be in the same hotel with her friends for her college tour. Deva mistakenly enters Indhu's room 11 when it was only her in the room alone. Deva mistakes her for the call girl and accidentally sleeps with her. When Ranjith comes looking for Deva, he sees him and Indhu in bed together.

After knowing this truth, Deva is guilty towards both Shruthi and Indhu. He decides not to marry Shruthi and says this to Ranjith. Ranjith, who wants Deva to be happy with his love, tells Ashok that he was the one who raped Indhu, and a fight ensues between them. Deva splits both of them up, saying that he was the one ruined Indhu's life. That night, Indhu confronts Deva and asks him to still marry Shruthi as she thinks it was just an accident between them. The next morning, just before Deva tying the auspicious thread on Shruthi, she stands up and asks him to stop acting. She says that she already knows that Deva was the one who raped Indhu through his unsent letters in Deva's room. She creates a havoc and refuses to marry Deva, and also embarrasses Indhu. Getting angry, Deva quickly marries Indhu. As he ties the thaali on Indhu, he looks at Shruthi where she smiles at him. It turns out to be Deva himself has told Shruthi about this incident and had asked her to act in such a way in the wedding the next day. She agrees to do so for Deva because of her love for him.

Cast 

 Prabhu Deva as Deva
 Kausalya as Indhu
 Gayatri Jayaraman as Shruthi
 Vadivelu as Steve Waugh / Mark Waugh / Mr.Waugh and Mrs.Waugh
 Vivek as Valaiyapathi
 Ranjith as Ranjith
 Sriman as Ashok (Indhu's brother)
 Shanthi Williams as Indhu and Ashok's mother
 Sharon as Bruce, Valaiyapathi's and Steve's girlfriend
 Fathima Babu as Dr. Kamali
 Rajeev as Dr. R. K. Viswanath
 Pandu as Hostel Warden
 Kaka Radhakrishnan as Shruthi's grandfather
 Bayilvan Ranganathan as Rowdy
 Madhan Bob as Principal
 P. Susheela as Herself
 Siva (uncredited)

Production
The producers of the film initially tried to rope in Shilpa Shetty to play the lead heroine, but the actress refused as her previous pairing with Prabhu Deva in Mr. Romeo ended up being a commercial failure. Sonia Agarwal was rejected after make-up test and she was replaced by newcomer Gayatri Jayaraman. Priyanka Trivedi was also initially announced as being a part of the cast, though she was later replaced by Kausalya.

Soundtrack
The soundtrack, composed by Yuvan Shankar Raja was released on 22 September 2001 by Sa Re Ga Ma. It features 6 tracks, lyrics were penned by Pa. Vijay and Kalai Kumar. The songs "All Day Jolly Day" and "Manja Kaattu Maina" were some of the most popular songs of 2001 and went on to become some of the chartbusters of that year.

Release and reception
The film released on 14 November 2001. Rediff wrote: "On paper, Manathai Thirudi Vittai seems to have everything going for it. Yet, somehow, it doesn't quite jell. For the most part, the film oscillates between the good and the merely banal". Hindu wrote:"Armed with a suspenseful story and a cohesive screenplay, director has come out with a fare that is reasonably appealing". Visual Dasan of Kalki wrote the film, which should have been made in the lines of Kadhal Kottai, with a strong foundation of compelling plot, good climax and new visual settings, has been wasted by commercial aspects.

Legacy 
Over the years the film's comedy has been appreciated by many people. Vadivelu's character of Steve Waugh inspired countless memes. The dialogue "Give respect, take respect" is parodied by Ashwanth Ashokkumar in Thambi (2019).

References

External links
 Manadhai Thirudivittai at CineSouth

2001 films
Films shot in Ooty
2000s Tamil-language films
Indian romantic comedy films
Films scored by Yuvan Shankar Raja
2001 romantic comedy films